Platyptilia interpres is a moth of the family Pterophoridae. It is known from Uganda.

References

interpres
Endemic fauna of Uganda
Insects of Uganda
Moths of Africa
Moths described in 1922